Microcosmodes is a genus of beetles in the family Carabidae, containing the following species:

 Microcosmodes amabilis (Dejean, 1831) 
 Microcosmodes angolensis (Chaudoir, 1879) 
 Microcosmodes chaudoiri (Raffray, 1886) 
 Microcosmodes cheranganensis (Burgeon, 1936) 
 Microcosmodes cruciatus (Dejean, 1831) 
 Microcosmodes diversopictus (Basilewsky, 1949) 
 Microcosmodes elegans (Barker, 1922) 
 Microcosmodes flavopilosus (Laferte-Senectere, 1851)
 Microcosmodes grandis (Basilewsky, 1947) 
 Microcosmodes laetiusculus (Chaudoir, 1879) 
 Microcosmodes laetus (Dejean, 1831) 
 Microcosmodes luebberti (Kuntzen, 1919) 
 Microcosmodes marakwetianus (Burgeon, 1936) 
 Microcosmodes natalensis (Peringuey, 1896) 
 Microcosmodes perrieri Jeannel, 1949 
 Microcosmodes pierroni (Fairmaire, 1880) 
 Microcosmodes planicollis (Chaudoir, 1876) 
 Microcosmodes quadrimaculatus (Csiki, 1907) 
 Microcosmodes quadrinotulatus (Motschulsky, 1864) 
 Microcosmodes symei (Murray, 1857) 
 Microcosmodes tenuipunctatus (Laferte-Senectere, 1851) 
 Microcosmodes vadoni Jeannel, 1949 
 Microcosmodes villosulus (Chaudoir, 1879) 
 Microcosmodes vivinus (Murray, 1857)

References

Panagaeinae